Rhapsody in Blue is a 1945 fictionalized screen biography of the American composer and musician George Gershwin (1898–1937), released by Warner Brothers.

Production background
Starring Robert Alda as Gershwin, the film features a few of Gershwin's acquaintances (including Paul Whiteman, Al Jolson, and Oscar Levant) playing themselves. Alexis Smith and Joan Leslie play fictional women in Gershwin's life, Morris Carnovsky and Rosemary De Camp play Gershwin's parents, and Herbert Rudley portrays his brother, Ira Gershwin. Levant also recorded most of the piano playing in the movie, and also dubbed Alda's piano playing. Both Rhapsody in Blue and An American in Paris are performed nearly completely, with the "Rhapsody in Blue" debut of 1924 orchestrated by Ferde Grofe and conducted, as it was originally, by Whiteman himself.

The film introduces two fictional romances into the story, one with a woman named Julie Adams, played by Leslie, and the other a near-romance with a rich society woman played by Smith.

The film notably features performances of Gershwin music by two African-American musicians/singers, Anne Brown and Hazel Scott. Both were child prodigies whose training included study at the Juilliard School. Brown, a soprano, created the role of "Bess" in the original production of Gershwin's opera Porgy and Bess in 1935. In the film, she sings the aria  Summertime from Porgy and Bess, albeit rearranged, with the first verse sung by chorus only. Scott, who became known as a jazz and classical pianist and singer, was one of the first African-American women to have a career in Hollywood as well as television. She plays herself in the film, performing in a Paris nightclub.

Cast

Production
Irving Rapper felt it was "a rambling story, a little too sentimental at times, although written by some wonderful people, mainly Clifford Odets with far, far too much music."

Rapper wanted Tyrone Power to play the lead but had to use Robert Alda. The director says apart from Alda's casting he was happy with the film.

Reception
Contemporary reviews praised the music but had more mixed opinions about the plot. Bosley Crowther of The New York Times called the film a "standard biography," explaining: "There is never any true clarification of what makes the gentleman run, no interior grasp of his nature, no dramatic continuity to his life. The whole thing unfolds in fleeting episodes, with characters viewing the genius with anxiety or awe, and the progression is not helped by many obvious and telescoping cuts. Throughout, the brilliant music of Mr. Gershwin is spotted abundantly, and that is the best—in fact, the only—intrinsically right thing in the film." Variety reported that the film "can't miss" with "such an embarrassment of musical riches," to the point that "corny lapses" in the script "can easily be glossed over." Harrison's Reports wrote that the musical score was "in itself worth the price of admission," while the film also offered "an inspiring, heart-warming story." Wolcott Gibbs of The New Yorker called the music "magnificent", but criticized the plot as a "monumental collection of nonsense," describing the romance as "silly and tiresome."

Box office
According to Warner Bros. records, the film earned $3,342,000 domestically and $1,514,000 foreign.

Awards and nominations
The film was nominated for the Grand Prize at the 1946 Cannes Film Festival. The film was also nominated for two Academy Awards; Academy Award for Best Original Score (Ray Heindorf and Max Steiner) and Best Sound Recording (Nathan Levinson).

References

External links

 
 
 
 

1945 films
1940s biographical drama films
American biographical drama films
1940s English-language films
American black-and-white films
Biographical films about musicians
Films about composers
Films about musical theatre
George Gershwin in film
Warner Bros. films
Films directed by Irving Rapper
Films scored by Max Steiner
Films scored by Ray Heindorf
Cultural depictions of classical musicians
1945 drama films
1940s American films